Krzysztof Smorszczewski (born 26 May 1963) is a Paralympian athlete from Poland competing mainly in category F56 shot put events.

Krzysztof is a two time Paralympic gold medalist in the shot put having won the F56 class in 2000 and  2004 and won a silver in the 2008 Summer Paralympics.  He also competed in the javelin in the 2000 and 2004 Paralympics.

External links
 

Paralympic athletes of Poland
Athletes (track and field) at the 2000 Summer Paralympics
Athletes (track and field) at the 2004 Summer Paralympics
Athletes (track and field) at the 2008 Summer Paralympics
Athletes (track and field) at the 2012 Summer Paralympics
Paralympic gold medalists for Poland
Paralympic silver medalists for Poland
Place of birth missing (living people)
Living people
1963 births
Medalists at the 2000 Summer Paralympics
Medalists at the 2004 Summer Paralympics
Medalists at the 2008 Summer Paralympics
Paralympic medalists in athletics (track and field)
Polish male shot putters
20th-century Polish people
21st-century Polish people
Wheelchair shot putters
Paralympic shot putters